Green Street is an album by American jazz guitarist Grant Green featuring performances recorded and released on the Blue Note label in 1961. Green is backed by bassist Ben Tucker and drummer Dave Bailey. The CD reissue features two alternate takes from the same session as bonus tracks.

Reception

The Allmusic review by Michael G. Nastos awarded the album 4 stars and stated "Green Street stands as one of Grant Green's best recordings of many he produced in the ten prolific years he was with the Blue Note label".

Track listing
All compositions by Grant Green except as indicated

 "No. 1 Green Street" – 7:20
 "'Round About Midnight" (Thelonious Monk) – 7:04
 "Grant's Dimensions" – 7:56
 "Green with Envy" – 9:46
 "Alone Together" (Howard Dietz, Arthur Schwartz) – 7:13
Bonus tracks on CD reissue:
"Green with Envy" [Alternate take] – 7:55
 "Alone Together" [Alternate take] – 6:56

Personnel
Grant Green – guitar
Ben Tucker – bass
Dave Bailey – drums

References 

Blue Note Records albums
Grant Green albums
1961 albums
Albums produced by Alfred Lion
Albums recorded at Van Gelder Studio